Nerdfighteria is a mainly online-based community subculture that originated on YouTube in 2007, when the VlogBrothers (John and Hank Green) rose to prominence in the YouTube community. As their popularity grew, so did coverage on Nerdfighteria, whose followers are individually known as Nerdfighters. The term was coined when John saw a copy of the arcade game Aero Fighters and misread the title as Nerd Fighters. 

Hank Green describes it as "a community that sprung up around our videos, and basically we just get together and try to do awesome things and have a good time and fight against world suck". He defines "world suck" as "the amount of suck in the world". The Greens established The Foundation to Decrease World Suck, in order to raise funds and launch projects that would help a variety of causes. Nerdfighters believe in fighting world suck, promoting education, freedom of speech and the use of the intellect in modern society. Nerdfighters and the Green brothers have collaborated on many projects such as the charitable drive, Project for Awesome which launched in 2007, and VidCon, the convention focusing on topics surrounding the world of digital media. Nerdfighters have been documented by websites such as The Hollywood Reporter, and The Wall Street Journal, with a following estimated to be in the millions.

Community topics
Nerdfighteria is known for its online collaborative nature: forums, spinoff blogs, meet-ups, and charitable events have been spawned by its members. Instances of the community collaborating can be observed in the creation of college campus groups at universities such as the University of Maryland, Texas Christian University, the University of British Columbia, and the University of California, Los Angeles. Another Nerdfighter club was founded at Auburn University, in which the members have stated their desire to do charity work with The Humane Society and This Star Won't Go Out.

The Nerdfighter subculture was able to force the release of the novel The Fault in Our Stars five months early. Additionally, safety concerns caused by 5,000 fans crowding the stage at the 2014 Q&A tour at the Dolphin Mall caused the event to be shut down early.

Symbols and terminology

A prominent symbol in Nerdfighter culture is a double-handed gesture with crossed arms, with both hands in a v-symbol, similar to Star Trek's "Vulcan salute". Celebrities such as actor Benedict Cumberbatch and Olympian Jennifer Pinches have been documented demonstrating Nerdfighter hand gestures. The symbol has been referred to as a Nerdfighter "gang sign" or a "salute". Additionally, the initialism "DFTBA", standing for "Don't Forget To Be Awesome", is generally considered the motto of the community.

"World suck" is another word included in the Nerdfighter vocabulary, which refers to unfavorable things that occur in the world. To decrease "world suck", the Greens founded a charitable non-profit organization, in which Nerdfighters collaborate to promote social activism.

Meetups

The collaborative nature of the Nerdfighter community has resulted in meetups, sometimes involving the Green brothers. In 2008, the Greens held an event in Chicago, which proved to be a turning point for both the Green brothers, as well as Nerdfighteria. Hank recalled the event as the first time he could sell his music, as well as a precursor for DFTBA Records. John added to his brother's comments, stating, "This was also the first time I met Rosianna, who is now my assistant, and the first time we really understood the power of nerdfighter gatherings, and it happened at the Chicago Public Library, one of the first places to get behind my novels in a big institution-wide way, and wow, what an important day in our lives." The event would be the first of several meetups within the community, as the Greens founded VidCon, which was first held in 2010, attracting 1,400 in attendance.

Censuses and Surveys
The VlogBrothers enjoy connecting to their audience and community, which sometimes involves the use of surveys.

In 2013, Hank Green began an annual "Nerdfighter Census". The census survey is hosted on SurveyMonkey, and its results are analyzed by Hank. In 2014, over 100,000 people filled out the survey. Hank discovered that 72% of the responders are female, 85% are non-Hispanic white, as well as mostly American between the ages of 13 and 30.

Charity events and activism

A key component of the Nerdfighter community is the involvement with charity events and fan activism. Events such as Project for Awesome, have allowed a way for Nerdfighter involvement with charitable actions.

Nerdfighters work closely with another group that promotes community activism, the Harry Potter Alliance. Nerdfighteria and HPA were able to raise $123,000 for Partners in Health, enough to send five cargo planes to Haiti, as a way to assist the citizens of Haiti following the 2010 earthquake.

Kiva.org Nerdfighters
Nerdfighters are the third largest community of lenders to Kiva.org, a non-profit organization which helps people lacking access to traditional banking systems by granting loans to them.

Various instances of micro loans from Nerdfighters funding entrepreneurs in developing countries have been documented. Overall as of November 2022, more than 44,000 Nerdfighters have loaned a total amount of $20.2 million, ranking #4 all-time across all teams on Kiva.org. Exercising the interactive nature of the community, the Greens made a deal of sorts with Nerdfighteria: to have the community reach over $1 million in funds donated to Kiva before the Greens reached 1,000 videos on their VlogBrothers channel. Nerdfighters were able to accomplish this feat.

Project for Awesome

A major event in the Nerdfighter community is Project for Awesome. The event, initially known as the "Nerdfighter Power Project for Awesome", launched in 2007, and occurred annually in December until it was moved to February in 2022; the 2020 iteration was cancelled due to the effects of the COVID-19 pandemic. On the topic of the overwhelming amounts the event has been able to raise, Hank has stated "YouTube was caught pretty off guard by the first P4A, but ever since then they've been hugely supportive." During Project for Awesome, people post videos advocating for worthy charities, and the Nerdfighter community votes for the charities they believe are most deserving of funding.

In 2014, this system was modified so that money raised on the first day goes to Save the Children and Partners in Health, and money raised on the second day goes to the community chosen organizations. This change was enacted so that wealthy charities feel comfortable donating to P4A and to ensure that some charities are reputable charities who are known to do a great deal of good. The first-day recipients in the 2015 campaign were Save the Children and the United Nations High Commissioner for Refugees.

AFC Wimbledon
Aside from charity drives, Nerdfighteria also offers funding and support for AFC Wimbledon, a fourth-tier football club in England. Ad revenue from John's videos on the Green brothers' YouTube gaming channel, Hankgames, go to sponsoring and supporting the football club.

In January 2014, John Green became an official sponsor of the club, and later in the year the Greens' sponsorship led to a Nerdfighter logo design, with the DFTBA catchphrase being featured on the club's kits. In 2015, AFC Wimbledon was drawn to play a match against Liverpool F.C., who John has been a longtime fan of. Green flew to London to spectate the game in person. One of the spectator stands at Wimbledon's now-former stadium, Kingsmeadow, was named after John at the start of the 2015–16 season.

In April 2016, John announced he would be making a "docudrama" with "comedic moments" about the story of AFC Wimbledon, set to be distributed by 20th Century Fox.

This Star Won't Go Out and Esther Day

Another non-profit foundation associated with the community is This Star Won't Go Out, founded by Wayne and Lori Earl, in memory of their daughter, Esther. The name of the foundation stems from the fact that "Esther" means "star" in Persian. The program itself provides funds and assistance to families of children with cancer. Esther Earl was diagnosed with thyroid cancer in 2006, and, before her death in 2010, developed a bond with the VlogBrothers and the Nerdfighter community. John Green and Earl met and bonded at a Harry Potter conference in 2009. She would be involved with Nerdfighteria and YouTube, as she was a vlogging personality, until her death on August 25, 2010, at the age of 16.

Shortly before her death, on August 2, 2010, the day before her 16th birthday, John uploaded a video in preparation for "Esther Day", which would be celebrated the following day. Earl stated she wanted the day to be about "family and love". Two days following her death, the VlogBrothers made a video titled Rest In Awesome, Esther, remembering her and all of her contributions to the Nerdfighter community, as well as the world. Nerdfighteria continues to keep her memory alive through her foundation, as well as Esther Day, which is celebrated each year on August 3. John Green states that Esther Day is the "most important holiday in Nerdfighteria," and that Esther, herself, has become a hero in the community.

Earl would later be known as an inspiration for the main character Hazel in John Green's novel The Fault in Our Stars, as well as its film adaptation.

References

Articles containing video clips
Green brothers
Internet-based activism
Internet-related activism
Internet culture
Nerd culture
Subcultures
2000s in Internet culture
2010s in Internet culture
2020s in Internet culture